Heighington is a railway station on the Tees Valley Line, which runs between  and  via . It is owned by Network Rail and managed by Northern Trains.

The station is on the Bishop Line which is a community railway from Bishop Auckland to Darlington. It is somewhat unusual in that its platforms are staggered, sited either side of a level crossing. The station has kept its listed manual signal box (which supervises the aforementioned crossing, the connection into the Hitachi plant and the single line section south of here through to Darlington), but this had its semaphore signals replaced by colour lights when the connection into the Hitachi factory was installed and commissioned in November 2014.

History
The station lies on the route of the Stockton and Darlington Railway (S&D), the first public railway. It was here in 1825 that Locomotion No. 1 designed by George Stephenson was placed on the track prior to first journey. Once it was placed on the line and all was ready, it was found that nobody had means of lighting the boiler. Stephenson sent a messenger to get a lit lantern. However, at this point a navvy called Robert Metcalf stepped forward and offered use of his "burning glass" (a piece of glass similar to a magnifying glass) which he used to light his pipe. It was with this that Stephenson was able to light the boiler for that first journey.

The main line of the S&D was opened on 27 September 1825 from Phoenix Colliery at Etherley to Stockton, and this station was opened the same day, being originally named Aycliffe Lane. It was subsequently renamed three times: first to Aycliffe and Heighington, later, on 1 July 1871, it became Aycliffe, although this name lasted for just over three years, because on 1 September 1874 it gained the present name of Heighington.

The grade II listed signal box was opened 1872 and was originally commissioned by the North Eastern Railway Central Division. It is one of the earliest signal boxes in the country still in existence and it is believed that at the most only four pre-date it. The design was possibly by Thomas Prosser, the company's architect. The building fits the earliest Central Division design which the Signalling Study Group classified the design as Type C1.

The original signal lever frame mechanism was replaced 1906. At the time of its inspection prior to gaining listed status in 2007 this 1906 mechanism was still in use. The lever frame was extended around 1912. The extension to both mechanism and building is believed to have been done in order to fit signalling controls for a new electrified line. The lever system was to the current 11 levers in 1987.

On the opposite side of the railway line are the original station buildings dating from around 1826-27 or 1835 depending on source. The original design called for a public house which would act as a waiting room. Although the buildings no longer form part of the modern station the pub is still in use, called the Locomotion Number 1. A cobbled area outside of the pub is believed to be part of the original 1825 station platform.

Accidents and incidents
 On 1 July 1828, the boiler of Locomotion No. 1 exploded, killing the driver.

Facilities
The station is unmanned and has a card-only ticket machine, so all passengers wanting to buy tickets with cash must buy on board the train or prior to travel. The amenities here were improved as part of the Tees Valley Metro project in 2013. The long-line public-address system (PA) has been renewed and upgraded with pre-recorded train announcements. Running information can also be obtained by telephone and timetable poster boards. Step-free access is available to both platforms via ramps from the crossing.

Services

As of the May 2021 timetable change, the station is served by an hourly service between Saltburn and Bishop Auckland via Darlington. All services are operated by Northern Trains.

Rolling stock used: Class 156 Super Sprinter and Class 158 Express Sprinter

Intercity Express Programme factory
The new Hitachi Intercity Express Programme train assembly plant was built not far from the station in the Aycliffe Business Park and opened in 2015. Work commenced on the £82 million facility in March 2014 and it was officially opened on 3 September 2015 by UK Prime Minister David Cameron. The new class 800/801 IEP sets will be built or fitted out here for use on the East Coast Main Line and Great Western Main Line, along with class 385 (AT200) commuter EMUs destined for use on Scottish suburban routes around Glasgow and Edinburgh.

References

External links
 
 

Railway stations in County Durham
DfT Category F2 stations
Stockton and Darlington Railway
Former North Eastern Railway (UK) stations
Railway stations in Great Britain opened in 1825
Northern franchise railway stations
Newton Aycliffe